Volga Bulgaria or Volga–Kama Bulgaria, was a historic Bulgar state that existed between the 9th and 13th centuries around the confluence of the Volga and Kama River, in what is now European Russia. Volga Bulgaria was a multi-ethnic state with large numbers of Turkic Bulgars, a variety of Finnic and Ugric peoples, and many East Slavs. Its strategic position of allowed it to create a monopoly between the trade of Arabs, Norse and Avars.

History

Origin and creation of the state 
The Bulgars were Turkic tribes of Oghuric origin, who settled north of the Black Sea. During their westward migration across the Eurasian steppe, they came under the overlordship of the Khazars, leading other ethnic groups, including Finnic and Iranic peoples. In about 630 they founded Old Great Bulgaria, which was destroyed by the Khazars in 668. Kubrat's son and appointed heir, Batbayan Bezmer, moved from the Azov region in about AD 665, commanded by the Kazarig Khagan Kotrag, to whom he had surrendered. They reached Idel-Ural in the eighth century, where they became the dominant population at the end of the 9th century, uniting other tribes of different origin who lived in the area. Some Bulgar tribes, however, continued westward and eventually settled along the Danube River, in what is now known as Bulgaria proper, where they created a confederation with the Slavs, adopting a South Slavic language and the Eastern Orthodox faith.

Most scholars agree that the Volga Bulgars were initially subject to the Khazarian Khaganate. This fragmented Volga Bulgaria grew in size and power and gradually freed itself from the influence of the Khazars. Sometime in the late 9th century, unification processes started and the capital was established at Bolghar (also spelled Bulgar) city, 160 km south of modern Kazan. However, complete independence was reached after Khazaria's destruction and conquest by Sviatoslav in the late 10th century; thus, Bulgars no longer paid tribute to it.

Abu al-Ghazi Bahadur named the Volga Bulgar people as Ulak.

Conversion to Islam and further statehood
Volga Bulgaria adopted Islam in 922 – 66 years before the Christianization of Kievan Rus'. In 921 Almış sent an ambassador to the Caliph requesting religious instruction. Next year an embassy returned with Ibn Fadlan as secretary. A significant number of Muslims already lived in the country.

The Volga Bulgars attempted to convert Vladimir I of Kiev to Islam; however Vladimir rejected the notion of Rus' giving up wine, which he declared was the "very joy of their lives".

Commanding the Volga River in its middle course, the state controlled much of trade between Europe and Asia prior to the Crusades (which made other trade routes practicable). The capital, Bolghar, was a thriving city, rivalling in size and wealth the greatest centres of the Islamic world. Trade partners of Bolghar included from Vikings, Bjarmland, Yugra and Nenets in the north to Baghdad and Constantinople in the south, from Western Europe to China in the East. Other major cities included Bilär, Suar (Suwar), Qaşan (Kashan) and Cükätaw (Juketau). Modern cities Kazan and Yelabuga were founded as Volga Bulgaria's border fortresses. Some of the Volga Bulgarian cities have still not been found, but they are mentioned in old East Slavic sources. They are: Ashli (Oshel), Tuxçin (Tukhchin), İbrahim (Bryakhimov), Taw İle. Some of them were ruined during and after the Golden Horde invasion.

The Rus' principalities to the west posed the only tangible military threat. In the 11th century, the country was devastated by several raids by other Rus'. Then, at the turn of the 12th and 13th centuries, the rulers of Vladimir (notably Andrew the Pious and Vsevolod III), anxious to defend their eastern border, systematically pillaged Volga Bulgarian cities. Under Rus' pressure from the west, the Volga Bulgars had to move their capital from Bolghar to Bilär.

Decline

In September 1223 near Samara an advance guard of Genghis Khan's army under command of Uran, son of Subutai Bahadur, entered Volga Bulgaria but was defeated in the Battle of Samara Bend. In 1236, the Mongols returned and in five years had subjugated the whole country, which at that time was suffering from internal war . Henceforth Volga Bulgaria became a part of the Ulus Jochi, later known as the Golden Horde. It was divided into several principalities; each of them became a vassal of the Golden Horde and received some autonomy. By the 1430s, the Khanate of Kazan was established as the most important of these principalities.

Coats of arms of Volga Bulgaria during Tsarist Russia 
Ivan III was also called the "Prince of Bulgaria". The mention of the Bulgarian land has been present in the royal title since 1490. This refers to Volga Bulgaria.Ivan by the grace of God is the sovereign of all Russia and the Grand Duke of Vladimir, and Moscow, and Novgorod, and Pskov, and Tver, and Yugra, and Prmsk, and Bolgar and othersIt is known that the Bulgarian coat of arms figure was used to designate the Bulgarian Kingdom and in the Great Seal of Tsar John IV. The seal was a "lion walking" (which is confirmed by the seals of the Volga Bulgarians found by archaeologists). On the coats of arms and seals of the Russian tsars, the lands of Volga Bulgaria were represented on a green field by a silver walking lamb with a red banner divided by a silver cross; the shaft is gold. The erroneous perception of the beast on the Bulgarian coat of Arms in the Royal Titular as a lamb is explained by the poor quality of the reproduction of the image.

In the "Historical Dictionary of Russian Sovereigns ..." by I. Nekhachin (ed. by A.Reshetnikov, 1793), the Bulgarian coat of arms is described as follows: "Bulgarian, in a blue field, a silver lamb wearing a red banner." Over time, the colour of the shield changed to green. In the Manifesto on the full coat of arms of the Empire (1800), the Bulgarian coat of arms is described as follows: "In a green field it has a white Lamb with a golden radiance near its head; in its right front paw it holds a Christian banner." The description of the coat of arms, approved in 1857: "The Bulgarian coat of arms: a silver lamb walking in a green field, with a scarlet banner, on which the cross is also silver; the shaft is gold."

Demographics
A large part of the region's population included Turkic groups such as Sabirs, Esegel, Barsil, Bilars, Baranjars and part of the obscure Burtas (by ibn Rustah). Modern Chuvashes claim to descend from Sabirs, Esegel and Volga Bulgars.

Another part comprised Volga Finnic and Magyar (Asagel and Pascatir) tribes, from which Bisermäns probably descend. Ibn Fadlan refers to Volga Bulgaria as Saqaliba, a general Arabic term for Slavic people. Other researches tie the term to the ethnic name Scythian (or Saka in Persian).

According to some historians, over 80% of the country's population was killed during the invasion. The remaining population mostly relocated to the northern areas (territories of modern Chuvashia and Tatarstan). Some autonomous duchies appeared in those areas.

Over time, the cities of Volga Bulgaria were rebuilt and became trade and craft centres of the Golden Horde. Some Volga Bulgars, primarily masters and craftsmen, were forcibly moved to Sarai and other southern cities of the Golden Horde. Volga Bulgaria remained a centre of agriculture and handicraft.

Gallery

See also 
Timeline of Turks (500-1300)
Atil
Balymer
Khanate of Kazan
Qol Ghali
Battle of Samara Bend
Tatars
Old Great Bulgaria
Huns

References

External links 

 
  Bariev, R(iza) X. 2005. Волжские Булгары : история и культура (Volga Bulgars: History and Culture). Saint Petersburg: Agat.

 
1240 disestablishments in Europe
States and territories established in the 7th century
States and territories disestablished in the 1240s
Former Muslim countries in Europe
7th-century establishments in Europe
Barbarian kingdoms
Former monarchies